Stephen Earle Buyer (born November 26, 1958) is  an American former politician who served as the U.S. representative for , and previously the , serving from 1993 until 2011. On March 10, 2023, Buyer was found guilty of four counts of insider trading and is awaiting sentencing.  He is a member of the Republican Party. In 2012, Buyer started working for R.J. Reynolds, promoting the use of smokeless tobacco.  

On January 29, 2010, Buyer announced he would not seek a tenth term to the House to spend more time with his wife, who has an incurable autoimmune disease.

Early life, education and career
Buyer was born in Rensselaer, Indiana. In 1976, he graduated from North White High School, where he had been class president. In 1980, he received a Bachelor of Science in business administration and management from The Citadel, The Military College of South Carolina, and in 1984, he received a Juris Doctor from the Valparaiso University School of Law.

Buyer served three years on active duty in the Army between 1984 and 1987. His first civilian job, from 1987 to 1998, was as an Indiana state deputy attorney general; he then started his own private law practice.  He was elected to the U.S. House of Representative in November 1992, at age 33.

Military career
Buyer attended The JAG School at the University of Virginia and entered U.S. Army JAG Corps. As an Army reserve officer, had three years of active duty after graduating from law school in 1984. During the Gulf War (1990–1991), Buyer, then a captain, spent five months on active duty giving legal counsel to commanders and interrogating Iraqi P.O.W.s.

On March 20, 2003, Buyer announced to Congress that "I have been called to active duty in the United States Army. Pending further orders, I request immediate indefinite leave of the United States House of Representatives to accommodate my military duties." He also said that "a need was identified, of which Congressman Buyer has the unique skill and experience to meet the requirements," to serve in Iraq.  Claiming to be called to active duty, he took a leave of absence from Congress.

Buyer spent his paid absence from Congress in his home in Monticello, Indiana. Ten days later, he said he had not been activated, contradicting his previous statement and that he was returning to Congress. Defense Department rules prevent those on active duty from campaigning for and holding elective office. Thus in June 2003, the Indianapolis Star reported that the Army, in a March 31 letter to Buyer signed by Army secretary Thomas White, had rejected Buyer's offer to serve in the Iraq War, because "we are able to meet the need without your participation" and "we are concerned that your presence would put in jeopardy the safety of those serving around you."  

In April 2004, Buyer was promoted to colonel in the United States Army Reserve by President George W. Bush in the Oval Office.

U.S. Representative

Committee assignments
Committee on Energy and Commerce (2001–2010)
Subcommittee on Communications, Technology and the Internet
Subcommittee on Health
Committee on Veterans' Affairs (1993–2010)
Chairman of the Veterans' Affairs Committee 109th Congress
Ranking Member of the Veterans' Affairs Committee 110th and 111th Congresses
House Committee on Judiciary 1993–1999
House Armed Services Committee 1993–2001
Chairman of the Subcommittee on Military Personnel 105th and 106th Congresses

Caucuses
National Guard and Reserve Components Caucus
Co-Chairman and Founder
Congressional Automotive Caucus
Congressional Steel Caucus

In 1999, Buyer served one of the House managers (prosecutors) in the impeachment trial of President Bill Clinton.

Political positions

Term limits
In his 1992 campaign, Buyer supported bringing to a vote on the House floor a Congressional amendment for term limits on members of Congress.  He voted for the measure and it received a majority of vote but not the 2/3 votes needed to pass.

Torture
Buyer, who interrogated captured Iraqis during the Gulf War, voted against the Detainee Treatment Act of 2005, specifically the no torture amendment offered by Senator John McCain. He reasoned that torture was already unlawful. He stated, "I think the people of Indiana need to know that there's a lot of grandstanding going on here, there's a lot of self-projection."

Smoking
In June 2009, Buyer became the subject of some prime-time TV news attention when he likened the physical effects of smoking tobacco to those of smoking dried, rolled lettuce or grass when taking the floor against the Family Smoking Prevention and Tobacco Control Act. He stated:

[Y]ou could have smoked that lettuce and you would still end up with the same problems. You could cut the grass in your yard, dry it and roll it up in a cigarette and smoke it, and you're still going to have a lot of problems. It is the smoke that kills, not the nicotine. It's the smoke.

Healthcare
In working to improve America's health care system Buyer believes Congress should be focusing on what is broken with the current health care system and keep what is working and leave alone what Americans like about their health care and insurance, "So, when we talk about health care reform, we want to preserve that which is right, and we want to work on that which is wrong. When my Democrat colleagues of the leadership talk about health care reform, it's about a government-run, socialized health system. Let's reject that and let's work together."

The American Conservative Union gave him a lifetime rating of 91%.

Political campaigns
When Buyer first ran for Congress in 1992, he faced three-term Democratic incumbent Jim Jontz in what was then the 5th District, comprising twenty primarily rural counties in north central Indiana.  Republican Bud Hillis had represented the district for 16 years until his retirement in 1986.  Jontz, then a state senator, was elected in the face of divided Republican opposition.  Buyer defeated Jontz by just over 5,000 votes.  He would never face another contest nearly that close, and was re-elected four times from this district with an average of 62 percent of the vote.

In 2002, Buyer's district was renumbered as the 4th District, made up of 12 counties in west central Indiana, after the state lost a district in the 2000s round of redistricting. Buyer had five opponents in the Republican primary, including fellow Republican congressman Brian Kerns. Buyer won with 55 percent of the primary vote.  He easily won this heavily Republican district in November with 71 percent of the vote and was re-elected three more times after that with an average of 63 percent of the vote.

2004/2006

In November 2004 and November 2006, Buyer defeated Democrat David Sanders (biologist),  who was running on a pro-veterans benefits and anti-Iraq war platform.

2008

In November 2008, Buyer defeated Democrat Nels Ackerson, spending $895,000 compared to $845,000 by Ackerson. Buyer won with 60 percent of the vote.

2010 retirement

On January 29, 2010, Buyer announced his retirement from Congress.  In the following January, Buyer became a lobbyist for McKesson Corp.; as he was prohibited from lobbying Congress due to a one-year "cooling off" period mandated for all retired Congressmen by federal law, he stated that his lobbying would be restricted to the executive branch.  in 2012 Buyer started working for R.J. Reynolds, promoting the use of smokeless tobacco.

Campaign funds
Between January 2006 and October 2009, the most significant combined donations to Buyer's campaigns came from the pharmaceutical industry ($263,000) and the healthcare professional industry ($214,000).
In recent years, his largest corporate donors have included Eli Lilly and Company, AT&T Inc. and Reynolds American.

Frontier Education Foundation
In 2003, Buyer created The Frontier Education Foundation, whose stated purpose is educational funding for college students.  The initial $25,000 to start the foundation came from the pharmaceutical lobbying organization PhRMA.  The foundation was located in Buyer's campaign office until 2009, when after a complaint was filed, it moved to an office 3 blocks away.  In addition, weeks before that interview, Buyer's campaign chairman, who had also managed the Foundation, ceased operating as the Foundation's director.  She was receiving a salary from the foundation ranging $12,000–$17,000 a year. Buyer's daughter Colleen was the president of the foundation until August 1, 2009.  His son Ryan, in 2009, was director of the foundation, according to filings with the Indiana Secretary of State 

In early October 2009, Buyer's press secretary referred questions to the foundation, saying "It's not Congressman Buyer's foundation," although the foundation shared an office with Buyer's campaign office in Monticello. Several days later, Buyer said he had created the foundation, with the goal of creating a sustainable organization to award scholarships to high school seniors.

As of the end of 2008, annual fundraising golf outings had raised more than $880,000 for the foundation.  Almost all the contributions were from 20 companies and trade organizations that had interests before the House Energy and Commerce Committee, of which Buyer is a member. As of October 2009, the foundation had not awarded any scholarships, and had given out only $10,500 in charitable grants, almost half of which went to a cancer fund run by the chief Washington lobbyist for Eli Lilly and Company.  Buyer said the foundation would need to raise at least $1 million to become self-sustaining; it would then begin awarding scholarships.

In June 2009, Buyer said "there is no connection" between his legislative actions and donations to the foundation. "I'm not an officer. I'm not a board director," he said of his role in the non-profit. "Do I help the foundation? Yes, I do. Do I help other charity groups? Yes, I do."

On January 25, 2010, CREW (Citizens for Responsibility and Ethics in Washington) filed complaints against Rep. Buyer with the Office of Congressional Ethics and the IRS regarding possible ethics and federal tax law violations referencing The Frontier Education Foundation.
The complaint was later dismissed.

Insider trading 
On July 25, 2022, Buyer was arrested and charged by the Securities and Exchange Commission (SEC) for insider trading. According to the SEC's complaint, after leaving Congress in 2011, Buyer formed a consulting firm, the Steve Buyer Group, which provided services to T-Mobile. In March 2018, Buyer attended a golf outing with a T-Mobile executive, from whom he learned about the company's then nonpublic plan to acquire Sprint. Buyer began purchasing Sprint securities the next day, and, ahead of the merger announcement, he acquired a total of $568,000 of Sprint common stock in his personal accounts, a joint account with his cousin, and an acquaintance's account. The complaint also seeks disgorgement from Buyer's wife, Joni Lynn Buyer, who profited when Buyer executed unlawful trades in her brokerage account. In a parallel action, the U.S. Attorney's Office for the Southern District of New York announced related criminal charges.

Buyer was found guilty of insider trading on March 10, 2023. His sentence will be given on July 11, 2023.

Personal life
In 2008, in Golf Digest's list of the top 200 golfers among political power brokers in Washington, Buyer was ranked 32nd, with a handicap of 5.6.

Buyer's daughter Colleen was the president of the Frontier Foundation until August 1, 2009. In 2007, she graduated from Purdue University with a Doctor of Pharmacy (PharmD) 

Buyer's son Ryan received a business administration degree from Ball State University in 2008. He was hired in June 2008 as a federal affairs manager for the Pharmaceutical Research and Manufacturers of America (PhRMA), a major lobbying organization in Washington, D.C., and the largest donor to the foundation. His position is just one step above an entry-level position, according to Ken Johnson, a senior vice president with PhRMA. "He's not a lobbyist. He researches legislation and writes reports," Johnson said. He first worked for PhRMA as an intern while in college. Johnson said that Ryan "went through the formal interview process, and he was brought on at the lowest rung of the organization as an intern and demonstrated a lot of willingness to learn and a great work ethic."

Buyer's wife Joni works as a Business Systems Analyst at Purdue University, in West Lafayette.  Spending more time with his wife, due to her incurable autoimmune disease, was cited as the reason Buyer left Congress.

References

External links

 

|-

|-

|-

|-

1958 births
20th-century American lawyers
20th-century American politicians
20th-century Methodists
21st-century American politicians
American United Methodists
Indiana lawyers
Living people
Military personnel from Indiana
People from Rensselaer, Indiana
People from Monticello, Indiana
Republican Party members of the United States House of Representatives from Indiana
The Citadel, The Military College of South Carolina alumni
The Judge Advocate General's Legal Center and School alumni
United States Army colonels
United States Army personnel of the Gulf War
United States Army reservists
Valparaiso University School of Law alumni
Members of Congress who became lobbyists